Elivelton Ribeiro Dantas (born 2 January 1992), known as Elivelto, is a Brazilian professional footballer who plays as a striker for Greek Super League 2 club Anagennisi Karditsa.

Career

Taraz
On 28 January 2019, FC Taraz announced the signing of Elivelto.

Sogdiana Jizzakh
Elivelto joined Sogdiana Jizzakh on 15 February 2020.

Honours
Žalgiris Vilnius
 A Lyga (2): 2015, 2016
 Lithuanian Cup (2): 2015–16, 2016
 Lithuanian Super Cup (2): 2016, 2017

References

1992 births
Living people
Brazilian footballers
Brazilian expatriate footballers
FK Ekranas players
FK Žalgiris players
Maccabi Petah Tikva F.C. players
FK RFS players
FC Taraz players
Expatriate footballers in Lithuania
Expatriate footballers in Israel
Expatriate footballers in Kazakhstan
Brazilian expatriate sportspeople in Lithuania
Brazilian expatriate sportspeople in Israel
A Lyga players
Israeli Premier League players
Kazakhstan Premier League players
Association football forwards